Marion Marguerite Stokes ( Butler; November 25, 1929December 14, 2012) was a Philadelphia, Pennsylvania, access television producer, civil rights demonstrator, activist, librarian, and prolific archivist, especially known for her compulsive hoarding and archiving of hundreds of thousands of hours of television news footage spanning 35 years, from 1977 until her death in 2012, at which time she operated nine properties and three storage units. According to The Los Angeles Review of Books's review of the 2019 documentary film Recorder, Stokes's massive project of recording the 24-hour news cycle "makes a compelling case for the significance of guerrilla archiving."

Collections

Television news 
Some of Stokes's tape collection consisted of 24/7 coverage of Fox, MSNBC, CNN, C-SPAN, CNBC, and other networks—recorded on up to eight separate VCRs in her house. She had a husband and children, and family outings were planned around the length of a VHS tape. Every six hours, when the tapes ran out, Stokes and her husband switched them out—even cutting meals short at restaurants to make it home to switch out tapes in time. Later in life, when she was less agile, Stokes trained a helper to do the task for her. The archives grew to about 71,000 (originally erroneously reported as 140,000 in the media) VHS and Betamax tapes (many up to 8 hours each) stacked in her home and apartments she rented just to store them.

Stokes became convinced there was a lot of detail in the news at risk of disappearing forever, so she began taping. Her son, Michael Metelits, told WNYC that Stokes "channeled her natural hoarding tendencies to [the] task [of creating an archive]".

Stokes's collection is not the only instance of massive television footage taping, but the care in preserving the collection is very unusual. Known collections of similar scale have not been as well-maintained and lack the timely and local focus.

Macintosh computers 
Stokes bought many Macintosh computers since the brand's inception, along with various other Apple peripherals. At her death, 192 of the computers remained in her possession. Stokes kept the unopened items in a climate-controlled storage garage for posterity. The collection, speculated to be one of the last of its nature remaining, sold on eBay to an anonymous buyer. Sensing the immense potential of the Apple brand during its infancy, Stokes invested in Apple stock while the company was still fledgling with capital from her in-laws. Later, she encouraged her already rich in-laws to invest in Apple, advice they took and profited greatly from, increasing their wealth even further. Stokes then allocated part of her profits to her recording project, which was important for her work, especially for the first few years when videotapes were a new, expensive technology.

Others 
Stokes received half a dozen daily newspapers and 100 to 150 monthly periodicals, collected for half a century. She accumulated 30,000 to 40,000 books. Metelits told WNYC that in the mid-1970s the family frequented the bookstore to purchase $800 worth of new books. She also collected toys and dollhouses.

Select list of programs recorded 
 Divorce Court
 Nightline
 The Cosby Show
 Star Trek
 The Today Show
 The Oprah Winfrey Show

Television producer 
From 1967 to 1969, Stokes co-produced a Sunday morning television show in Philadelphia, Input, with her husband John. Its focus was on social justice.

Legacy 
Stokes bequeathed her son Michael Metelits the entire tape collection, with no instructions other than to donate it to a charity of his choice. After considering potential recipients, Metelits gave the collection to the Internet Archive one year after Stokes's death. Four shipping containers were required to move the collection to Internet Archive's headquarters in San Francisco, a move that cost her estate $16,000. It was the largest collection they had ever received.

The group agreed to digitize the volumes, a process expected to run fully on round-the-clock volunteers, costing $2 million and taking 20 digitizing machines several years to complete. As of April 2019, the project is still active.

A documentary about her life, Recorder: The Marion Stokes Project, was directed by Matt Wolf and premiered at the 2019 Tribeca Film Festival.

Stokes has been called a pioneer and visionary who committed much of her life to preserving televisual history. Her primary objective was to "protect the truth" from fake news and to let people assess the archived material objectively. Stokes's final recording took place as she was dying; it captured coverage of the Sandy Hook massacre.

See also 
 Vanderbilt Television News Archive
 
 List of archivists

References

External links 
 Marion Stokes Collection at The Internet Archive – personal papers, books, films, photos, video and audio recordings are stored and may be browsed by searching for 'Marion Stokes'
 "Input" (1968–71) – one of the first television programs Marion Stokes was involved in producing at then-CBS affiliate WCAU-TV10; features political discussion and debate among people of varying socioeconomic statuses. She made sure the original Ampex one inch tape broadcast reels were preserved and then copied them to Betamax L-500 tapes when the format was launched in the late 1970s.
 TLDR podcast episode on the legacy of Marion Stokes; features an interview with her son, as well as Roger Macdonald, the director of the Internet Archive's television archive.

1929 births
2012 deaths
African-American activists
Activists for African-American civil rights
Activists from Philadelphia
African-American librarians
American archivists
American librarians
American women librarians
Deaths from lung disease
Internet Archive collections
Television producers from Pennsylvania
American women television producers
Female archivists
American communists
History of television
Hoarders
Rediscovered television